Huntleya gustavii is a species of orchid that occurs from Colombia and Ecuador and of late it is decreasing in population.

References

gustavii